Richard Raymond (born 1965 in Campbellton, New Brunswick) is a Canadian pianist. He has performed with the Toronto and Montreal Symphony Orchestras, but is most known for his solo chamber music recitals and recordings.

Education
Raymond studied with Leon Fleisher, Marc Durand, John Perry, Lise Boucher and Antoine Reboulot. He holds a master's degree in music from Université de Montréal and an Artist Diploma from the Royal Conservatory of Music of Toronto and the Peabody Conservatory of Music in Baltimore, Maryland.

Awards 
In 1990, Raymond won first prize in the 18-25-year-old category of the Montreal Symphony Orchestra Competition, as well as first prize in the Canadian International Stepping Stone Competition. In 1991 he won the grand prize in CBC Radio's National Competition for Young Performers. In 1993, he was the first Canadian to receive the Chamber Music Prize in the Van Cliburn International Piano Competition, and in 1998, he took Second Prize in the William Kapell International Piano Competition and won the Virginia Parker Prize. He has been nominated for an East Coast Music Award and an OPUS Prize.

Discography 
Richard Raymond (Musica Viva, 1993)
Liszt: Piano Works (Music Viva, 1995)
Chopin: Waltzes (Analekta, 2001)
Reubke, Beethoven: Piano Sonatas (Analekta, 2003)

References 
The Canada Council for the Arts: New Brunswick Pianist Richard Raymond

External links 
Web Concert Hall: Interview with Richard Raymond

Living people
1965 births
Université de Montréal alumni
The Royal Conservatory of Music alumni
People from Campbellton, New Brunswick
21st-century Canadian pianists